Midland Civic Arena is a 1,000-seat indoor arena located in Midland, Michigan.  This three-rink arena is used primarily for hockey and ice skating and opened in 2005.  High school and youth hockey regularly takes place here. The arena is managed by former professional hockey player, Bob Scurfield.

References

External links
Official website

Indoor ice hockey venues in the United States
Indoor arenas in Michigan
Sports venues in Michigan
Midland, Michigan
Buildings and structures in Midland County, Michigan
Sports venues completed in 2005